The Tyler Baronetcy, of Queenhithe in the City of London and of Penywern Road in Kensington in the County of London, was a title in the Baronetage of the United Kingdom. It was created in 1894 for Sir George Tyler, Lord Mayor of London from 1893 to 1894. The title became extinct on the death of the second Baronet in 1907.

Tyler baronets, of Queenhithe and Penywern Road (1894)
Sir George Robert Tyler, 1st Baronet (1835–1897)
Sir Frederick Charles Tyler, 2nd Baronet (1865–1907)

References

Extinct baronetcies in the Baronetage of the United Kingdom